Bertechramnus or Bertram of Le Mans was one of the wealthiest bishops of 6th-century Gaul.  He was bishop of Le Mans from 587 until 623.

At the time of his death his will listed a private holding of over 3,000 square kilometres of land.  By the end of his time as bishop there were 18 churches in Le Mans.

References

6th-century Frankish bishops
7th-century Frankish bishops
Bishops of Le Mans
7th-century Frankish writers
7th-century Latin writers